Beer Léon Fould (5 March 1767 – 14 May 1855) was a French-Jewish banker, and the founder of the Fould banking dynasty.

Born in Boulay-Moselle as the son of Jacob Bernard Fould, a small-time wine dealer, he began working for Herz Cerfbeer of Medelsheim, being sent to Paris in 1784. He started his own banking business in the 1790s, and became particular influential during the Second French Empire. His son Achille Fould would later serve as French Finance minister under Napoleon III.

References

1767 births
1855 deaths
People from Boulay-Moselle
18th-century French Jews
French bankers
Burials at Père Lachaise Cemetery
Fould family